Bret Johnson (born February 6, 1970) is a former Canadian football quarterback in the Canadian Football League who played for the Toronto Argonauts. He played college football for the UCLA Bruins and Michigan State Spartans.

His brother is former NFL quarterback Rob Johnson.

References

1970 births
Living people
American football quarterbacks
Canadian football quarterbacks
Toronto Argonauts players
UCLA Bruins football players
Michigan State Spartans football players